This is a list of seasons completed by the Los Angeles Kiss. The Kiss were a professional arena football franchise of the Arena Football League (AFL), based in Anaheim, California. The team was established in 2013, played their first season in 2014 and played their final season in 2016.

References
General
 

Arena Football League seasons by team
 
Los Angeles sports-related lists